Franklin Imo Aigbirhio,  (born 2 January 1962) is a Nigerian-born British chemist and academic specialising in biomedical imaging research. Since 2014 he has been the Professor of Molecular Imaging Chemistry at the University of Cambridge.

Early life and education 

Aigbirhio was born 2 January 1962 to Samuel Aigbirhio and Victoria Aigbirhio in Benin City, Nigeria. He came to United Kingdom in 1968 and was educated at Heaton Comprehensive School in Newcastle Upon Tyne. He graduated with a Bachelor Of Science degree in chemical sciences at the University of East Anglia in 1984. This was followed by a DPhil in physical organometallic chemistry from the University of Sussex in 1988 under the supervision of Colin Eaborn.

Academic career 
Aigbirhio began his academic career in 1988 with postdoctoral research at the University of Sheffield with Peter Maitlis. He then joined the MRC Cyclotron Unit in 1991, changing research focus to radiochemistry for biomedical imaging applications. With appointment as a senior research associate he joined the Wolfson Brain Imaging Centre at the University of Cambridge in 1997 as a founding staff member. As the centre’s Head of PET Chemistry, he established its chemistry programme and facility. This was followed by appointments as the centre’s Director of PET Sciences (2006-19) and Co-Director (2017-18). 

He was promoted to a university grade of principal research associate in 2004, the first person to be appointed to this grade at the University of Cambridge. This was then followed by promotion to the Professor of Molecular Imaging Chemistry at the Department of Clinical Neurosciences, University of Cambridge in 2014. He became an affiliated professor at the Department of Chemistry, University of Cambridge in 2020.

At college level he was elected a senior research fellow of Magdalene College, Cambridge in 2020.

On a national level he has been Lead for the Dementias Platform UK Imaging Network (2014–2021) and has been the chair of the UK PET Innovation Network since 2019.

Research focus 
Aigbirhio research is in the field of molecular imaging, with a focus on using the nuclear medicine technique of positron emission tomography (PET).  His research consists of developing radiochemical methods and PET radiotracers which can be used for imaging and investigating disease mechanisms and, hence developing new treatments. His programme of research has included applying PET imaging to brain injury, stroke, neurodegenerative disorders and hypertension.

Diversity activities 
On promotion to a personal Chair in 2014, he became the only black professor at the University of Cambridge and has been involved in many activities to increase diversity in higher education.  As part of this he became Co-Chair of the University of Cambridge Racial Equality Network in 2020.

Recognition 
Aigbirhio is a Fellow of the Royal Society of Chemistry (FRSC) and was elected  Fellow of the Academy of Medical Sciences (FMedSci) in 2020

References 

1962 births
Living people
Alumni of the University of East Anglia
Alumni of the University of Sussex
British chemists
Academics of the University of Cambridge
Fellows of Magdalene College, Cambridge
Black British academics
Fellows of the Royal Society of Chemistry
Fellows of the Academy of Medical Sciences (United Kingdom)